Theodore A. Tinsley (October 27, 1894 – March 3, 1979) was an American writer who primarily wrote mystery stories. Tinsley wrote 27 stories featuring The Shadow for The Shadow Magazine pulp magazine. He also created Carrie Cashin, one of the first female detectives in pulp fiction, who appeared in Street & Smith's Crimebuster pulp magazine. An early series he wrote is the "Amusement Inc./Scarlet Ace" series that ran over 4 different pulp magazines in the 1930s.

Early life

Theodore Adrian Tinsley was born on October 27, 1894 in New York City, the eldest of six children of Francis B. Tinsley, the owner of a coal yard, by his wife Gertrude (Theban) Tinsley. Tinsley graduated from City College of New York in 1916, and worked as a school teacher and insurance agent before fighting in World War I as a member of an anti-aircraft machine gun battery. He was a veteran of the battle of Meuse-Argonne.

Stories
Tinsley's Shadow stories are listed chronologically here:

Later life
On February 5, 1935, Theodore Tinsley married May Ethel White. In 1989, their daughter Dr. Adrian Tinsley would be named president of Fitchburg State University. 

During World War II, Tinsley moved to Washington, D.C. where he worked in the Writer's Division of the Office of War Information. After the war's end, he worked in public relations for the Veterans Administration until 1960, when he retired to Auburn, Alabama, where he spent the rest of his life. Tinsley died on March 3, 1979, at age 84.

References

1894 births
1979 deaths
20th-century American novelists
American male novelists
American mystery writers
Pulp fiction writers
20th-century American male writers
People of the United States Office of War Information